Alpha is the debut studio album by Jamaican musician Shenseea. It was released on March 11, 2022, through Rich Immigrants and Interscope Records. It includes guest appearances from 21 Savage, Beenie Man, Megan Thee Stallion, Offset, Sean Paul, and Tyga. Production is contributed by Rvssian, London On Da Track, and Scott Storch.

Background and release 
In 2019, Shenseea signed to Rich Immigrants, an imprint of Interscope Records. She praised the owner of the imprint, Rvssian, for allowing her to work with different producers, instead of limiting her to just him. The lead single of Alpha, "Lick", was released on January 21, 2022. The song is a collaboration with American rapper Megan Thee Stallion. The second single, "R U That", featuring Atlanta-based rapper 21 Savage, was released on February 17. The next single, "Deserve It", was released on March 3. It was performed on Jimmy Kimmel Live! the night of its release.

Title 
Shenseea originally opted to title the album Eleanor, after her late mother. She decided to change the album's title to Alpha because she didn't want to experience the sadness associated with her mother's death every time she spoke about the record.

Composition 
Alpha is a dancehall, hip hop, and pop record. The album begins with the ballad "Target", a "beachy" song with a twist regarding love at the end. The track which follows, "Can't Anymore", is a more gleeful offering, where Shenseea announces that "she want[s] to get nasty". Alpha remains in a positive mood through the fourth track "R U That", which features 21 Savage. The song was described as "cheeky", and its lyrics go through a list of qualifications that a potential lover must meet.

Commercial performance 
Alpha debuted at number two on the Billboard Reggae Albums chart, with 4,900 album-equivalent units, of which 800 were sales of the record. 2,000 album units were composed of individual song sales. The album received 4,616,400 on-demand audio streams in its first week of release; it earned 750,000 video streams in that time frame. Alpha's number-two chart positioning occurred beneath Bob Marley and the Wailers' greatest hits album Legend (1984), which received 11,162 album-equivalent units in the same week, and remained at number one on the chart for a 115th consecutive week. The following week, Alpha fell two spots to number four on the Reggae chart, moving 2,600 units.

Alpha posted the best first-week sales for a reggae album since Popcaan's album Fixtape (2020).

Track listing

Charts

References 

2022 albums
Dancehall albums
Hip hop albums by Jamaican artists
Pop albums by Jamaican artists